Deriner Dam is a concrete double-curved arch dam on the Çoruh River  east of Artvin in Artvin Province, Turkey. The main purpose of the dam is hydroelectric power production and additionally flood control. Construction on the dam began in 1998, the reservoir began to fill in February 2012 and the power station was completed by February 2013. It will have a 670 MW power house and is the tallest dam in Turkey. The dam is being implemented by Turkey's State Hydraulic Works and constructed by a consortium of Turkish, Russian and Swiss companies.

The dam is named after İbrahim Deriner, who died while serving as the Chief Engineer of its research team.

Background
In 1969, a survey of the energy potential of the Coruh River was carried out by the Electrical Power Resources Survey Administration and later potential dam foundations were investigated. Based on the studies and investigations, a master plan for the river was started in 1979 and completed in 1982. The feasibility study for the Deriner Dam was not completed until 1987 and was carried out by the Swiss branch of Poyry Energy and Turkey's Dolsar Engineering. Several factors delayed construction of the dam during this period. The cost of relocating roads in such a mountainous area would be high and the need for agricultural, not electric development was deemed a higher priority. As the demand for electricity in Turkey grew, the Çoruh Valley Project began its implementation. After negotiations and the signing of a protocol between the Turkish and Russian governments at the 1994 Turkish-Russian Mixed Economic Commission in Moscow, Turkey's State Hydraulic Works was authorized to move forward with the dam. The consortium started with the Russian company Technostroyexport and later expanded with Turkey's ERG Construction and the Swiss companies Stucky (engineering consulting), Andritz (turbines and hydromechanical works) and Alstom (generators, energy transmission and balance-of-plant). The Environmental Impact Assessment Report for the dam was completed and approved in 1995 and funding to begin the project was available in 1997. In 1998, the consortium received the site and construction commenced.

Construction

Construction on the Deriner Dam began in January 1998, and by the end of 2005, the Coruh River had been diverted around the construction site and the dam's foundation was excavated and prepared. The river was diverted on the right-bank by means of a  horseshoe-shaped tunnel with a  diameter. The foundation required extensive excavation because layers of decompressed rock existed above the sound granodiorite rock. To secure the foundation, over 2,000 re-stressable post-tensioned rock anchors were installed. At the end of 2005, workers began pouring concrete for the dam's foundation but because of funding, this was delayed between September 2006 and September 2007. By mid-2010,  of the needed  of concrete had been poured and 93% of the project was complete. The spillways within the dam's body were complete as well. On 24 February 2012, the dam was complete and began to impound its reservoir. The power station is expected to be operational by February 2013.

Specifications

Dam
The dam's other spillway consists of two tunnels, each on opposing banks behind the dam.

Power house
Contained in the power house are vertical Francis turbines that have a combined capacity of 670 MW and annual generation of 2,118 GWh. Water being transferred to the turbines does so by means of a  diameter penstock.

See also

Borçka Dam – downstream
Artvin Dam – upstream
List of dams and reservoirs in Turkey
List of tallest dams in the world

References

Dams in Artvin Province
Hydroelectric power stations in Turkey
Dams on the Çoruh River
Arch dams
Dams completed in 2012
2013 establishments in Turkey
Energy infrastructure completed in 2013
21st-century architecture in Turkey